Champs is an American sitcom that aired from January 9 until August 7, 1996.

Premise
The series is about five friends 20 years after they won a high school basketball championship together.

Cast
Timothy Busfield as Tom McManus
Ashley Crow as Linda McManus
Libby Winters as Phoebe McManus
Danny Pritchett as Jesse McManus
Ed Marinaro as Vince Massilli
Kevin Nealon as Marty Heslov
Ron McLarty as Coach Harris
Paul McCrane as Dr. Herb Barton
Julia Campbell as Doris Heslov

Episodes

References

External links

1996 American television series debuts
1996 American television series endings
1990s American sitcoms
English-language television shows
American Broadcasting Company original programming
Television series by Ubu Productions
Television series by DreamWorks Television
Television series created by Gary David Goldberg
Television shows set in Atlanta